Satin Island is a 2015 novel written by Tom McCarthy. It is McCarthy's fourth novel and fifth book.

Plot
The novel follows a protagonist, "U.", an employee of "the Company" which is a consulting firm. U is a former anthropologist who now applies his skills to cases handled by the Company.

Reception
The novel was well received. Duncan White, writing for The Telegraph, praised the novel's conclusion, saying it "...provokes and beguiles and, at the point of revelation, it withholds".

It was included on the shortlist of the 2015 Man Booker Prize.

References

2015 British novels
Novels set in London
Novels set in New York City
Jonathan Cape books
Postmodern novels